Attorney General Ryan may refer to:

Jim Ryan (politician) (born 1946), Attorney General of Illinois
T. J. Ryan (1876–1921), Attorney-General of Queensland
William H. Ryan Jr., Attorney General of Pennsylvania

See also
General Ryan (disambiguation)